Caloptilia pekinensis is a moth of the family Gracillariidae. It is known from Beijing, China.

References

pekinensis
Moths of Asia
Moths described in 1990